The modern constellation Hydrus is not included in the Three Enclosures and Twenty-Eight Mansions system of traditional Chinese uranography because its stars are too far south for observers in China to know about them prior to the introduction of Western star charts. Based on the work of Xu Guangqi and the German Jesuit missionary Johann Adam Schall von Bell in the late Ming Dynasty, this constellation has been classified under the 23 Southern Asterisms (近南極星區, Jìnnánjíxīngōu) with the names Snake's Tail (蛇尾, Shéwěi), Snake's Abdomen (蛇腹, Shéfù), Snake's Head (蛇首, Shéshǒu) and White Patched Nearby (附白, Fùbái).

The name of the western constellation in modern Chinese is 水蛇座 (shuǐ shé zuò), which means "the water snake constellation".

Stars
The map of Chinese constellation in constellation Hydrus area consists of:

See also
Chinese astronomy
Traditional Chinese star names
Chinese constellations

References

External links
Hong Kong Space Museum official website 
 Activities of Exhibition and Education in Astronomy at the National Museum of Natural Science 

Astronomy in China
Hydrus (constellation)